Gianni Bertolotti (born 12 February 1950) is a retired Italian professional basketball player.

Professional career
During his club career, Bertolotti was the FIBA Saporta Cup Finals Top Scorer, in 1978.

Italian national team
As a member of the senior Italian national basketball team, Bertolotti won a bronze medal at the 1975 EuroBasket. He also played at the 1977 EuroBasket, and at the 1976 Summer Olympics.

References

External links
FIBA Profile
FIBA Europe Profile
Italian League Profile 

1950 births
Living people
Basketball players at the 1976 Summer Olympics
Fortitudo Pallacanestro Bologna players
Italian men's basketball players
1978 FIBA World Championship players
Olympic basketball players of Italy
Pallacanestro Trieste players
Pallacanestro Virtus Roma players
Basketball players from Milan
Small forwards
Virtus Bologna players